Mario Costa (30 May 1904, in Rome – 22 October 1995, in Rome) was an Italian actor, director and screenwriter, active from 1934 to 1971.

Selected filmography

 Stadium (1934)
 The Last of the Bergeracs (1934)
 Guest for One Night (1939)
 The Barber of Seville (1947)
 Pagliacci (1948)
 Mad About Opera (1948)
 Cavalcade of Heroes (1950)
 Song of Spring (1951)
 Trieste mia! (1952)
 Repentance (1952)
 Melody of Love (1952)
 I Always Loved You (1953)
 Perdonami! (1953)
 For You I Have Sinned (1953)
 Pietà per chi cade (1954)
 The Lovers of Manon Lescaut (1954)
 Revelation (1955)
 Arrivano i dollari! (1957)
 Attack of the Moors (1959)
 Cavalier in Devil's Castle (1959)
 Queen of the Pirates (1960)
 The Centurion (1961)
 Kerim, Son of the Sheik (1962)
 Gladiator of Rome (1962)
 Buffalo Bill, Hero of the Far West (1964)
 Latin Lovers (1965)
 Rough Justice (1970)

References

External links
 

1904 births
1995 deaths
Italian film directors
Italian film editors
20th-century Italian screenwriters
20th-century Italian male actors
Italian male screenwriters
Knights Grand Cross of the Order of Merit of the Italian Republic
20th-century Italian male writers